This article lists the discography of the American rock band, REO Speedwagon. The band formed in the autumn of 1967 by Neal Doughty and Alan Gratzer. REO Speedwagon released their debut album, R.E.O. Speedwagon, in 1971. They have undergone many changes of personnel over the years, And today, currently the members of the band as of January 2023 are Kevin Cronin, Bruce Hall, Dave Amato, and Bryan Hitt. (See also List of REO Speedwagon members.)

Albums

Studio albums

Live albums

Compilation albums

Singles

Note: REO Speedwagon has several songs that never charted as singles but occasionally obtain airplay on classic rock stations. Those include "Keep Pushin'", "Back on the Road Again", "Golden Country", "Like You Do", and "Only the Strong Survive". Although listed here because they charted on the Mainstream Rock charts, "Tough Guys", "Out of Season", "Stillness of the Night" and "Good Trouble" were not released as singles.

Videography

Video albums

Music videos

Personnel

Notes

References

External links
 

 
Discographies of American artists
Rock music group discographies